Persepolis Athletic and Cultural Club (Persian:باشگاه فرهنگی ورزشی پرسپولیس) is an Iranian multisport club based in Tehran, Iran. It was established by Shahab Nazifpour. The club is most known for its football team, Persepolis F.C. which competes in the Iran Pro League. It also fields teams in futsal, taekwondo, volleyball, wrestling, handball, swimming, weightlifting, wheelchair basketball, judo, athletics, goalball, and chess. Persepolis Athletic and Cultural Club also owns and operates Persepolis University, Persepolis TV and Radio, Persepolis Energy Drink, and Persepolis Restaurants.

History

Shahin F.C. (1942–1967)

Shahin was established in 1942 by Dr. Abbas Ekrami, a teacher.
Ekrami founded the club with help of some young students under the motto

Shahin produced many talented players  like Parviz Dehdari, Masoud Boroumand, Homayoun Behzadi, Jafar Kashani, Hossein Kalani, Hamid Shirzadegan, and many more that played for Team Melli. These talents made Shahin popular in the 1960s but its very popularity was viewed as a threat by the Iran Football Federation and the Keihan Varzeshi newspaper (Iran's most important sports publication at the time).
The conflict between them became worse and on 9 July 1967, two days after Shahin's 3–0 win against Tehranjavan F.C., the Iran Sports Organization declared Shahin F.C. as dissolved. League attendance dropped and other clubs including Pas, Rah Ahan, and Oghab tried to sign Shahin players.

Establishment early years (1963–1969)

Persepolis Athletic and Cultural Club was established in 1963 by Ali Abdo. Abdo had returned to Iran from the United States and was a championship boxer.

Persepolis F.C. started the 1968 season with Parviz Dehdari as manager. Despite the efforts to sign and disperse Shahin players to various clubs, Parviz Dehdari and Masoud Boroumand transferred the popularity of Shahin to Persepolis F.C. by taking most Shahin Players to join Persepolis. The team was initially quite weak, and participated in the 2nd division of the country. The best player on the team then was Mahmoud Khordbin.

The club, using four Shahin players, had a friendly match with Jam Abadan, a respected team at the time. After the match the remainder of the Shahin players joined Persepolis. That year no league competition was held, as many teams had been dissolved, so a 44-team tournament was held, and Persepolis, along with Pas, Taj, and Oghab finished top of the group.

The next year they represented as the first Iranian club in the Asian Champion Club Tournament held in Thailand, but they were not successful and were eliminated in the group stage.

Chairpersons

*as Interim Chairman.

**as Deputy Chairman.

Ownership

*Privatization Organization

Divisions

University

Persepolis University 
It is first Iranian sport university which opened in 2013. Dariuosh Soudi was appointed as the first president of the university and Mehdi Mahdavikia was the first student of this university. This university has 600 students and accepts students in thirteen different fields.

Some fields provided by the university:

Football Coaching
Futsal Coaching
Fitness
Sport Reporting
Match Commentary

Football

Men's
Persepolis Football Club who play in Iran Pro League.  According to the AFC, Persepolis is Asia's number one supported club team. Only Dalian Shide and Al-Hilal have similar support in Asia. Persepolis is the most successful football club in Iran with the record of 11 titles in Iranian domestic football league as well as 5 domestic cup titles. Persepolis has also won an Asian Cup Winners' Cup. The current manager is Branko Ivankovich.

Women's

Futsal

Men's
Persepolis Futsal Club is a futsal team that play's in the Iran Futsal's 1st Division, the second-tier league in Iran. The team formerly played in the Super League, but after it ceased operations for a year, it was given a placement in the 2013–14 1st Division season. In 2014 Persepolis Futsal Club was again promoted to the Iranian Futsal Super League.

Women's
Persepolis WFSC is a women's futsal team the plays in the Iranian Women's Super League.

Weightlifting 
On 16 August 2012, under the approval of chairman Mohammad Rouyanian the Persepolis Weightlifting Team was established. Behdad Salimi the gold medallist at the 2012 Olympics became the team's first signing.

Taekwondo 
Persepolis' taekwondo team was founded recently, they have won one Iranian domestic championship.

Swimming 
The Persepolis Swimming Team was founded after the Iranian Revolution in 1979. The team has won the national competition once in its history.

Track and Field 
The Persepolis Track and Field team was founded in August 2012 with the permission of chairman Mohammad Rouyanian. Olympic bronze medallist Ehsan Hadadi became the team's first ever signing.

Bowling 
With the name of Abdo Bowling Club, it was one of Persepolis' first teams and was created by founder Ali Abdo. After the Iranian Revolution the team was dissolved.

Volleyball 

Persepolis VC is one of the oldest volleyball teams in Iran, it has currently ceased operations due to lack of funds.

Handball

Basketball

Judo

Chess

Wheelchair Basketball

Goalball

References

External links
   Official club website

Sports clubs established in 1963
Sport in Tehran

Multi-sport clubs in Iran
1963 establishments in Iran